Parinayam (Sanskrit: परिणयम) (from Sanskrit pari-ni-am, literally around-lead-noun, referring to Saat phere, the circambulation of two people around a fire for a Hindu wedding ceremony) in some Indian languages means Marriage.

 Parinayam (1994 film), an award-winning Malayalam film
 Sasirekha Parinayam, a folk tale
 Sasirekha Parinayam (film), a Telugu film
 Usha Parinayam, Indian drama